Pyaw Shwin Chin Wit Nyin is a 2018 Burmese comedy-horror television series. It aired on MRTV-4, from June 14 to July 12, 2018, on Mondays to Fridays at 19:00 for 21 episodes.

Cast
Kyaw Hsu as Ye Naung
Wint Yamone Naing as May Shar San
Thi Ha as Lin Let
Kyaw Soe as Dipar (Ghost#1)
Thun Thitsar Zaw as Yamin
Zaw Htet as Htun Htun
Shwe Sin Wint Shein as Shin Thant Phyu
Zin Myo as Thet Min
Tayzar Kyaw as Chan Myae
Nay Lin as Aung Aung (Ghost#2)
Shwe Eain Min as Wutyi Oo (Ghost#3)
Pan Thee as Win Htut (Ghost#4)
Ye Lay Ma as Ma Gyi Soe
Thaw Phone Sett (child actor) as Baby Ghost

References

Burmese television series
MRTV (TV network) original programming